Aleksandr Nikolayevich Balakhnin (born April 1, 1955) is a Russian professional football coach and a former player. He made his professional debut in the Soviet Second League in 1976 for FC Torpedo Taganrog.

His younger brother Sergei Balakhnin also played football professionally.

References

1955 births
Living people
Soviet footballers
Russian footballers
Russian Premier League players
FC Akhmat Grozny players
FC Kuban Krasnodar players
FC SKA Rostov-on-Don players
FC Rostov players
FC APK Morozovsk players
FC Lada-Tolyatti players
People from Belaya Kalitva
FC Taganrog players
Association football goalkeepers
FC Torpedo Moscow players
Sportspeople from Rostov Oblast